The Ginetta G4 is a sports car, designed, developed, and built by British manufacturer Ginetta, between 1961 and 1968.

Engine

Dimensions and weight
The length of the car is 3353 mm, the width is 1422 mm and the height is 1067 mm. The wheelbase is 2,045mm while the front and rear tracks are 1,168mm wide. The weight is 454 kg.

Miscellaneous
The car is available in 3 different bodies such as a 2-door coupé, a 2-door convertible, and a 2-door barquette reserved for competition. The front brakes are discs while the rear brakes are drums.

References

External links 

G15
Cars introduced in 1968
1970s cars
Sports cars
Kit cars
Rear-engined vehicles
Cars of England